Elkridge Landing was a Patapsco River seaport in Maryland, and is now part of Elkridge, Maryland. The historic Elkridge Furnace Inn site resides within the Patapsco Valley State Park.

Geography
Elkridge is located in present-day Howard County, Maryland, west of the Patapsco River, south of Route 1, and with the Baltimore and Ohio Railroad (B and O Railroad) running through the middle of the historic district. The historic roads are the old Washington Turnpike, now Main Street, Railroad Avenue, Paradise Avenue, Elkridge Heights Road and Furnace Avenue.

History

The Elkridge site
Pottery has been found dating back to 1800 B.C.E. and there is evidence of settlement along the Patapsco River until 1500 C.E.

Seaport
In 1690 the town and seaport of Elkridge Landing was settled in the Patapsco Valley of the Colony of Maryland. It was a deep-water port, with a channel about 10 to 14 feet deep, that brought ships inland from the Chesapeake Bay. Tobacco casks, or hogsheads, were rolled down Rolling Hill to the port by "long strings of slaves" and boarded ships. Manufactured iron was also shipped out of the port.

Native Americans lived north of the Elkridge Landing site in 1692 and rangers were appointed among the settlers to keep watch.

Around 1725 a 28 by 16 foot "Rowling House" with clapboard siding was built on the landing to store tobacco rolled in hogsheads to market. In 1727, the state ended the practice of having ship sailors personally retrieve hogsheads of tobacco themselves. Inland tobacco farms were able to increase productivity by rolling their own hogsheads to ports of Baltimore, Annapolis and Elkridge. Six acres around the Rowling house were surveyed by William Cromwell on 7 February 1743. The site was purchased by Caleb and Edward Dorsey and named "Calebs and Edwards Friendship".

The banks of the Patapsco River had been unearthed to mine for iron stone, which resulted in the displaced sand and earth being dumped into the river, affecting its navigability. In 1753 a law was enacted to prevent the further filling in of the Patapsco River's shipping channel at Elkridge Landing and up to Baltimore. Ships were unable to sail to Elkridge Landing after the first half of the 1700s.

By 1763, 50 percent of Anne Arundel's tobacco production was processed at the landing totaling 1,695 hogsheads. Christ Church Guilford would tax the tobacco to pay for the local sheriff and church expenses.

Jansen-Town
On April 12, 1733 an act was passed by the Maryland General Assembly making Elkridge Landing the town of Jansen-Town in what was then the County of Ann-Arundel. At that time 40 lots were created on 30 acres of land purchased near or on the Patapasco River.

Iron manufacturing

Caleb Dorsey, an ironmaster aware of iron ore found in the Patapsco River valley, established Dorsey's Forge in 1761. It ran on water power from the river and made nails and horseshoes. During the American Revolutionary War he made cannons and bayonets. As of 1787 there were 9 or more slaves that worked his operation.

In 1822 the business was purchased by Thomas, James and Benjamin Ellicott from Pennsylvania. It was first named Avalon Iron Works, but then became a nail factory and rolling mill. More than 100 people worked at the complex by the 1850s. The forge, factory and mill were destroyed in a flood in 1868. Two structures that remained are in the Patapsco Valley State Park. By 1880, the town was described as "A sorry village on the Patapsco, which once hoped to be the rival of Baltimore."

Transportation
The town became more prosperous when the Washington Turnpike and the railroad traversed through the town, resulting in new residential and commercial construction. During the American Civil War Union troops were deployed to protect both bridges. In the 1930s when Route 1 skirted the city, many commercial buildings moved alongside the highway.

Historic district

An application was submitted in 2003 to make it a historic district and is now on the Inventory of Historic Properties with the Maryland Historical Trust. There are business and residential properties built between the 1820s and 1920s within the district. It is one of the oldest settlements in Howard County, Maryland. Elkridge Landing is significant for its historic iron and shipping industries, role in development of the railroads in the 19th century, architecture and its archaeological potential.

Present
In 2015, the Howard County Council approved a payment-in-lieu of taxes agreement for Riverwatch, a middle-income townhouse and apartment development built by the KB Companies in coordination with the Howard County Housing and Community Development on Furnace Avenue replacing a series of small historic single family homes in the neighborhood.

Notable people
 Andrew Ellicott
 John Ellicott
 George Poe

See also
 Belmont Estate
 Elkridge Furnace Complex

Notes

References

External links
 Map of Elkridge Landing, 1860

Elkridge, Maryland
Populated places established in 1690
1690 establishments in Maryland